The 1931 Northwestern Wildcats team represented Northwestern University during the 1931 college football season. In their fifth year under head coach Dick Hanley, the Wildcats compiled a 7–1–1 record (5–1 against Big Ten Conference opponents), finished in a three-way with Purdue and Michigan for the Big Ten championship, and outscored their opponents by a combined total of 138 to 40.

Schedule

References

Northwestern
Northwestern Wildcats football seasons
Big Ten Conference football champion seasons
Northwestern Wildcats football